Ilia Volfson (born 8 June 1981, Kazan) is a Russian political figure a deputy of the 8th State Duma.
 
From 2003 to 2005, Volfson worked at the Inkomstroy, first as a senior manager and later as deputy director. From 2007 to 2016, he was the deputy director and co-owner of the Siti Stroy company. He left the post to become the director of the group of companies SMU-88. In 2015, he became the deputy of the Kazan City Duma of the 3rd convocation. In 2019-2021, he was the deputy of the State Council of the Republic of Tatarstan. Since September 2021, he has served as deputy of the 8th State Duma from the Privolzhsky constituency.

References
 

 

1981 births
Living people
United Russia politicians
21st-century Russian politicians
Eighth convocation members of the State Duma (Russian Federation)
Politicians from Kazan